Bahar Begum (born Kishwar Begum) is an actress best known for many Pakistani movies since 1956. She was first introduced to the Pakistani film industry by the renowned film director Anwar Kamal Pasha in film Chann Mahi (1956). Anwar Kamal Pasha is the one that gave her the professional film world name Bahar Begum. She later acted both in Punjabi, Pashto and Urdu language Pakistani films and had a very active career from 1956 through the 1980s. She has more than 600 films to her credit.

Early life and education
Bahar Begum studied at the Convent of Jesus and Mary Lahore, Pakistan.

Career
Having grown up in Lahore, Pakistan, her career has centered on the Punjabi film industry, initially playing heroines and then "emotionally strong mothers", usually ending-up playing 'mother' to popular lead actor of Punjabi films Sultan Rahi in his films during the 1980s. She has performed well in films playing a loud rural woman, especially the role of a Chaudhrani in Punjabi movies. Bahar Begum can speak Punjabi, Urdu, Pashto and English fluently.

Personal life
Bahar Begum married director and actor Iqbal Yousuf son of film director S. M. Yusuf some years later they divorced and she has one child.

Filmography

Television series

Film

Awards and recognition

References

External links
 Filmography of Bahar Begum on Complete Index To World Film (CITWF) website - Archived
 

Living people
1942 births
Pakistani film actresses
20th-century Pakistani actresses
21st-century Pakistani actresses
Actresses in Pashto cinema
Pakistani television actresses
Punjabi people
Actresses from Lahore
Actresses in Punjabi cinema
Actresses in Urdu cinema
Nigar Award winners
People from Lahore